Jelle van Gorkom (born 5 January 1991 in Doetinchem) is a Dutch racing cyclist and Olympic silver medalist who represents the Netherlands in BMX. He was selected to represent the Netherlands at the 2012 Summer Olympics in London in the men's BMX event, and went on to win the silver medal in the same event four years later at the 2016 Olympics in Rio.

On 9 January 2018, Van Gorkom suffered a serious crash in training at the National Sports Centre Papendal near Arnhem. He suffered damage to his skull, spleen, kidneys and liver, as well as broken ribs and a facial fracture, and went into a coma. On 13 January, the Royal Dutch Cycling Union (KNWU) announced that Van Gorkom was no longer receiving sleep medication, meaning "he must wake up from the coma on his own". On 22 January, KNWU officials said that he had awoken from the coma, but cautioned that the rider still faced a long rehabilitation.

See also
 List of Dutch Olympic cyclists

References

External links
 
 
 
 

1991 births
Living people
BMX riders
Dutch male cyclists
Olympic cyclists of the Netherlands
Olympic medalists in cycling
Olympic silver medalists for the Netherlands
Cyclists at the 2012 Summer Olympics
Cyclists at the 2016 Summer Olympics
Medalists at the 2016 Summer Olympics
European Games competitors for the Netherlands
Cyclists at the 2015 European Games
People from Doetinchem
Cyclists from Gelderland
21st-century Dutch people